The women's 100 metres T35 event at the 2020 Summer Paralympics in Tokyo, took place on 27 August 2021.

Records
Prior to the competition, the existing records were as follows:

Results

Heats
Heat 1 took place on 27 August 2021, at 10:00:

Heat 2 took place on 27 August 2021, at 10:07:

Final
The final took place on 27 August 2021, at 12:45

References

Women's 100 metres T35
2021 in women's athletics